Port de Grave is a defunct provincial electoral district for the House of Assembly of Newfoundland and Labrador, Canada.

Fishing was a prime industry in the district and many people commute to work in the St. John's area. Bay Roberts was an important service centre for the region and there is some light industrial activity. In 2011, there were 8,914 eligible voters living within the district.

The district included the communities of Bay Roberts, Bareneed, Bishop's Cove, Blow Me Down, Bryant's Cove, Hibb's Cove, Port de Grave, Ship Cove, Spaniard's Bay, The Dock, Tilton and Upper Island Cove.

The district was one of the strongest Liberal regions of the province, and was one of only three districts to return a Liberal MHA in the 2007 election. 

The district was abolished in 2015, and was succeeded by the new district of Harbour Grace-Port de Grave.

Members of the House of Assembly
The district has elected the following Members of the House of Assembly:

Election results

|-

|-

|-
 
|NDP
|Sarah Downey	
|align="right"|396
|align="right"|6.53%
|align="right"|
|}

|-

|-

|-
 
|NDP
|Randy Wayne Dawe
|align="right"|162
|align="right"|2.47%
|align="right"|
|}

|-

|-

|}

|-

|-

|}

|-

|-

|-
 
|NDP
|Steve Quigley
|align="right"|185
|align="right"|
|align="right"|
|}

References

External links 
Website of the Newfoundland and Labrador House of Assembly

Newfoundland and Labrador provincial electoral districts